Pomaderris subplicata, commonly known as concave pomaderris, is a species of flowering plant in the family Rhamnaceae and is endemic to Victoria in Australia. It is a shrub with softly-hairy branchlets, egg-shaped leaves, sometimes with the narrower end towards the base, and small clusters of pale yellow flowers.

Description
Both surfaces of the leaves are covered with soft, star-shaped hairs. The flowers are borne in small clusters in leaf axils near the ends of branchlets, each flower pale yellow on a pedicel . Flowering occurs in October.

Taxonomy
Pomaderris subplicata was first formally described in 1992 by Neville Grant Walsh in the journal Muelleria from specimens Walsh collected near Carboor Upper in north-east Victoria in 1990. The specific epithet (subplicata) means "somewhat folded", referring to the leaves.

Distribution and habitat
Concave pomaderris grows in woodland and shrubby forest on shallow soil in three locations south-east of Wangaratta in north-eastern Victoria.

Conservation status
Pomaderris subplicata is classified as "vulnerable" under the Australian Government  Environment Protection and Biodiversity Conservation Act and the Victorian Government Flora and Fauna Guarantee Act 1988, and a National Recovery Plan has been prepared. The main threats to the species include its small population size, weed invasion and grazing by rabbits and native herbivores.

References

Flora of Victoria (Australia)
subplicata
Plants described in 1992
Taxa named by Neville Grant Walsh